Leucojum aestivum, commonly called summer snowflake or Loddon lily (see ), is a plant species widely cultivated as an ornamental. It is native to most of Europe from Spain and Ireland to Ukraine, with the exception of Scandinavia, Russia, Belarus and the Baltic countries. It is also considered native to Turkey, Iran and the Caucasus. It is naturalized in Denmark, South Australia, New South Wales, Nova Scotia and much of the eastern United States.

Description
The flowering stem (scape) is hollow and has wings with translucent margins. The pendant flowers appear in late spring and are borne in umbels of usually three to five, sometimes as many as seven.

After flowering, the fruits develop flotation chambers but remain attached to the stem. In England, it has been recorded that flooding causes the stems to break and the fruits to be carried downstream and stranded in river debris or on flood-plains. The bulbs can also be transported during heavy floods and deposited on river banks.

Taxonomy
Leucojum aestivum was first described by Carl Linnaeus in 1759. The Latin specific epithet aestivum means "of the summer". Two subspecies have been recognized (sometimes as varieties rather than subspecies): the nominate L. aestivum subsp. aestivum and L. aestivum subsp. pulchellum. The latter has also been treated as a separate species, L. pulchellum. L. aestivum subsp. pulchellum is differentiated by its generally smaller dimensions. It has 1–5 flowers per stem compared to the 3–8 of subsp. aestivum and is restricted to swampy areas in the western Mediterranean. The World Checklist of Selected Plant Families does not recognize any infraspecific taxa.

Leucojum vernum, its close relative (and the only other species in the genus Leucojum), flowers in Spring.

Distribution and habitat
Leucojum aestivum is native to most of Europe, with the exception of Scandinavia, Russia, Belarus, and the Baltic Republics, and is also native to Turkey, the Caucasus, and Iran. It is naturalized in other parts of Europe, including Denmark, in South Australia, New South Wales, Nova Scotia, and much of the eastern United States. L. aestivum is found in damp places, such as wet meadows, swamps, and ditches.

Cultivation
Leucojum aestivum is cultivated as an ornamental plant for its flowers. It requires a damp position, growing well on clay soils, where it increases rapidly. It is named after Gravetye Manor, an Elizabethan manor house in West Sussex, England, the former home of the gardener William Robinson. 'Gravetye Giant' has gained the Royal Horticultural Society's Award of Garden Merit. Another cultivar is 'Nancy Lindsay'. It originated in a garden in southern France owned by Nancy Lindsay.

Toxicity
All species of Leucojum are poisonous, as the leaves and bulbs contain the toxic alkaloids lycorine and galantamine.

References

Amaryllidoideae
Flora of Europe
Flora of Turkey
Flora of Armenia
Flora of Georgia (country)
Flora of Azerbaijan
Plants described in 1759
Taxa named by Carl Linnaeus
Garden plants of Europe